Nova Life is a Greek satellite television channel owned by Nova, who own and operate a DTH satellite service with the same name. It was launched on May 13, 2013, and it features series, movies, talk shows, shows with showbiz news, making of, deleted scenes and backstage. Also, it broadcasts hit series from its sister channel Nova Cinema.

On August 1, 2016, it started broadcasting in HD.

In Cyprus it is available to the subscribers of Nova Cyprus and CytaVision.

Programmes

Current programming
The Ellen DeGeneres Show, a talk show
The Bachelor, a reality television dating game show
The Bachelorette, a reality television dating game show
America's Got Talent, a talent show
Britain's Got Talent, a talent show
American Idol, a talent show
Fitness Time, a show about yoga, pilates, meditation, health & spiritual well-being

Former programming
Lampater, a talk show
Life Time, a show-biz news show, hosted by Dimitri Kouroumpali and Κaterina Geronikoloy
Fashion and The City, a show about fashion news, architecture, interior design, fashion design etc.
One World Kitchen, a cook show
RealTalk, a talk show, hosted by Katerina Laspa
Gran Hotel
Rome
Police Woman
Hart to Hart
Charlie's Angels
Bewitched
Dharma & Greg
Magic City
Velvet

References

External links
Official site

Movie channels in Greece
Television channels in Greece
Greek-language television stations
Television channels and stations established in 2013
Pay television